Horațiu Năstase is a Romanian physicist and professor in the String Theory group at Instituto de Física Teórica of the São Paulo State University in São Paulo, Brazil.

He was born in Bucharest, Romania, and finished high school at the Nicolae Bălcescu High School (now Saint Sava National College). He did his undergraduate studies in the Physics Department of the University of Bucharest, graduating in 1995. His last year there he studied at the Niels Bohr Institute (NBI), Copenhagen University, with a scholarship which continued into the following year. In 1996 he joined the Physics Department of the State University of New York at Stony Brook from which he received his PhD in May 2000, with thesis written under the direction of Peter van Nieuwenhuizen. From 2000 to 2002 he was a postdoc at the Institute for Advanced Study in Princeton, after which he was an assistant research professor at Brown University until 2006. From 2007 to 2009 he was an assistant professor at the Global Edge Institute of the Tokyo Institute of Technology in Japan. Since 2010, Năstase holds a permanent position as assistant professor at IFT-UNESP in Brazil.

Năstase attracted some media attention in 2005 by arguing that string theory could be tested by the Relativistic Heavy Ion Collider, through the AdS/CFT correspondence. He is also known for his work in 2002 with David Berenstein and Juan Martín Maldacena to investigate the duality between strings on pp-wave spacetime and "BMN operators" in supersymmetric Yang–Mills theory.

Publications

References

External links

Instituto de Física Teórica Website

Living people
Year of birth missing (living people)
Scientists from Bucharest
Saint Sava National College alumni
University of Bucharest alumni
Romanian emigrants to the United States
Romanian physicists
String theorists
Theoretical physicists
Stony Brook University alumni
Brown University faculty
Academic staff of Tokyo Institute of Technology
Academic staff of the São Paulo State University